Henry Honywood Dombrain (1818–1905) was a British botanist, mycologist and cleric who specialised in the study of ornamental flowering plants.

Publications 
 1873. The gladiolus: its history, cultivation, and exhibition, (ed.) L. Reeve & Co, 56 pp. (Reissued 2009, Cornell University Library)
 1908. Roses for amateurs;: A practical guide to the selection and cultivation of the best roses for exhibition or garden decoration, (ed.) Gill; 3rd ed., 116 pp. (Reissued Kessinger Publishing 2009. )

References

External links

British botanists
1818 births
1905 deaths